Epimactis suffusella is a moth in the family Lecithoceridae. It was described by Francis Walker in 1864. It is found on Borneo.

Adults are straw coloured, the forewings slightly rounded at the tips and the costa and exterior border mostly fawn colour. There is a diffuse fawn-coloured discal patch. The exterior border is slightly convex and oblique.

References

Moths described in 1864
Epimactis